Bellview Airlines was an airline based in Sierra Leone. It was established and started operations in 1995, and was jointly owned by Bellview Airlines and Sierra-Leonean investors. It has since been merged back into the parent company in Nigeria.

The airline was on the List of air carriers banned in the European Union. In 2008, Bellview Airlines had its licence revoked.

Code data

IATA Code: O3
ICAO Code: BVU
Callsign: Not Allocated

Destinations
A variety of destinations in West Africa, including Freetown, Sierra Leone, Abidjan, Côte d'Ivoire and Accra, Ghana was served, as well as flights between Freetown and London Heathrow.

References

External links

Defunct airlines of Sierra Leone
Airlines established in 1983
Airlines disestablished in 2008